Wiebke Esdar (born 11 February 1984) is a German psychologist and politician of the Social Democratic Party (SPD). She has been a member of the Bundestag since the 2017 election, when she won the constituency of Bielefeld – Gütersloh II with 33.2% of the votes.

Early life and education
Esdar was born in Bielefeld. She studied psychology, social sciences and history at the University of Bielefeld and received her PhD degree in psychology in 2015.

Political career

Career in local politics
Esdar has been a member of the SPD since 2005 and became the chairwoman of the SPD in Bielefeld in 2016.

Member of the German Parliament, 2017–present
Esdar has been a member of the German Bundestag since the 2017 elections, representing Bielefeld and Gütersloh. In parliament, served on the Finance Committee and the Committee on Education, Research and Technology Assessment from 2018 to 2021. In this capacity, she was her parliamentary group's rapporteur on universities. Since 2021, she has been part of the Budget Committee. In 2022, she also joined the parliamentary body charged with overseeing a 100 billion euro special fund to strengthen Germany’s armed forces.

Within the SPD parliamentary group, Esdar belongs to the Parliamentary Left, a left-wing movement.

In the negotiations to form a so-called traffic light coalition of the SPD, the Green Party and the Free Democrats (FDP) following the 2021 German elections, Esdar was part of her party's delegation in the working group on innovation and research, co-chaired by Thomas Losse-Müller, Katharina Fegebank and Lydia Hüskens.

Other activities

Corporate boards
 Stadtwerke Bielefeld, Member of the Supervisory Board
 Stadtwerke Gütersloh, Member of the Supervisory Board

Non-profit organizations
 Leibniz Association, Member of the Senate (since 2022)
 Business Forum of the Social Democratic Party of Germany, Member of the Advisory Board on Economic Policy (since 2020)
 Education and Science Workers' Union (GEW), Member
 IG Metall, Member

Personal life
Esdar is married to fellow SPD politician Veith Lemmen. They have a son.

References

External links 
Personal homepage

1984 births
Living people
Members of the Bundestag 2021–2025
Members of the Bundestag 2017–2021
Members of the Bundestag for North Rhine-Westphalia
Members of the Bundestag for the Social Democratic Party of Germany